Naeem Masih (born 2 February 1987) is a Pakistani para-athlete. He represented Pakistan at the 2012 Summer Paralympics.

Masih was selected to run in the men's 1500m - T46 event at the 2012 London Paralympic Games.  He came last in Heat 2 with a season's best time of 4:51.35.

References

1987 births
Living people
Athletes (track and field) at the 2012 Summer Paralympics
Pakistani male middle-distance runners
Paralympic athletes of Pakistan
Pakistani disabled sportspeople
Middle-distance runners with limb difference
Sportsmen with disabilities